Chulpan (Sulpan) is a rural locality (a village) in Uslinsky Selsoviet, Sterlitamaksky District, Bashkortostan, Russia. The population was 26 as of 2010. There is 1 street.

Geography 
Chulpan is located 32 km northwest of Sterlitamak (the district's administrative centre) by road. Nizhniye Usly is the nearest rural locality.

References 

Rural localities in Sterlitamaksky District